The flocculonodular lobe (vestibulocerebellum) is a lobe of the cerebellum consisting of the nodule and the flocculus. The two flocculi are connected to the midline structure called the nodulus by thin pedicles. It is placed on the anteroinferior surface of cerebellum.

This region of the cerebellum has important connections to the vestibular nuclei and uses information about head movement to influence eye movement. Lesions to this area can result in multiple deficits in visual tracking and oculomotor control (such as nystagmus and vertigo), integration of vestibular information for eye and head control, as well as control of axial muscles for balance. This lobe is also involved in the maintenance of balance equilibrium and muscle tone. The most common cause of damage to the flocculonodular lobe is medulloblastoma in childhood.

References

External links
 NIF Search - Flocculonodular lobe via the Neuroscience Information Framework

Cerebellum